Hazelwood is a city in St. Louis County, Missouri, within Greater St. Louis. It is a second-ring northern suburb of St. Louis. Based on the 2020 United States census, the city had a total population of 25,485. It is located north of St. Louis-Lambert International Airport and is situated on Interstates 270 and 170, as well as the much-traveled Lindbergh Boulevard and Highway 370.

Geography 
Hazelwood is located at  (38.778750, -90.366464).

Demographics

2010 census
As of the census of 2010, there were 25,703 people, 10,933 households, and 6,608 families living in the city. The racial makeup of the city was 64.1% White, 30.5% African American, 0.3% Native American, 1.4% Asian, 1.2% from other races, and 2.5% from two or more races. Hispanic or Latino of any race were 3.0% of the population.

There were 10,933 households, of which 31.2% had children under the age of 18 living with them, 38.3% were married couples living together, 17.3% had a female householder with no husband present, 4.8% had a male householder with no wife present, and 39.6% were non-families. 33.7% of all households were made up of individuals, and 10.4% had someone living alone who was 65 years of age or older. The average household size was 2.34 and the average family size was 3.01.

The median age in the city was 36.8 years. 23.2% of residents were under the age of 18; 9.9% were between the ages of 18 and 24; 27% were from 25 to 44; 27.2% were from 45 to 64; and 12.4% were 65 years of age or older. The gender makeup of the city was 47.0% male and 53.0% female.

The median household income was $47,838, and the median family income was $57,293. Males had a median income of $42,399 compared with $35,800 for females. The per capita income for the city was $24,651. About 8.3% of families and 9.3% of the population were below the poverty line, including 15.2% of those under age 18 and 4.9% of those age 65 or over.

2000 census
As of the census of 2000, there were 26,206 people, 10,954 households, and 6,714 families living in the city. The racial makeup of the city was 80.24% White, 16.04% African American, 1.19% Asian, 0.18% Native American, 0.06% Pacific Islander, 0.52% from other races, and 1.76% from two or more races. Hispanic or Latino of any race were 1.60% of the population.

There were 10,954 households, out of which 29.6% had children under the age of 18 living with them, 44.4% were married couples living together, 12.7% had a female householder with no husband present, and 38.7% were non-families. 32.1% of all households were made up of individuals, and 9.7% had someone living alone who was 65 years of age or older. The average household size was 2.38 and the average family size was 3.05.

In the city, the population was spread out, with 24.6% under the age of 18, 9.7% from 18 to 24, 31.7% from 25 to 44, 22.4% from 45 to 64, and 11.6% who were 65 years of age or older. The median age was 36 years. For every 100 females, there were 92.3 males. For every 100 women age 18 and over, there were 89.0 men.

The median income for a household in the city was $45,110, and the median income for a family was $52,656. Males had a median income of $40,031 versus $27,871 for females. The per capita income for the city was $22,311. About 4.3% of families and 6.3% of the population were below the poverty line, including 8.1% of those under age 18 and 7.2% of those age 65 or over.

Climate

Education
Hazelwood is covered by the Hazelwood public school district. The city has one high school, Hazelwood West. The city also has one middle school, Hazelwood West Middle School, and several elementary schools (McNair, Russell and Garrett). There is also one Early Childhood Education Center in Hazelwood. 

There are also several private schools in Hazelwood; Alphabet Soup Academy, Asa Christian Academy, Blossom Wood Day School, and Oak Bridge.

Gateway Legacy Christian Academy, an international boarding school with students from over 30 countries, is presently located at the historic former St. Stanislaus Seminary.

Public Libraries 
St. Louis County Library operates the Prairie Commons Branch in Hazelwood.

Economy
Due to its location along Interstate 270 between Interstate 170 and Missouri 370, as well as adjacency to St. Louis-Lambert International Airport, Hazelwood is a major regional hub for manufacturing, distribution, and office facilities. The city is home to a substantial workforce with 17,063 jobs as of 2015, according to the U.S. Census Bureau.

The city was home to a Ford plant from 1948 to 2006 and employed 1,400 at the time of closure. The site of the former plant is in the process of being redeveloped into Aviator Business Park. On the opposite side of Lindbergh Blvd., after the completion of one building in 2007, the Great Recession and ownership troubles stalled the now-named Hazelwood Logistics Center until the land was sold in 2015. The new owners finishing building out the park with a total of 1.8 million square feet of industrial space completed and leased between 2015 and mid-2018. The industrial park is expected to generate 1,800 jobs. TradePort is a 325-acre industrial park under construction north of the St. Louis Outlet Mall (formerly St. Louis Mills) that upon completion in the mid-2020s will feature up to 4 million square feet of new industrial development.

Hazelwood is home to the headquarters of Mallinckrodt Pharmaceuticals and several facilities for Boeing.

Notable people
T. R. Carr: Mayor of Hazelwood, Missouri, from April 2000 until April 2009.

References

External links
 City of Hazelwood official website

Cities in St. Louis County, Missouri
Cities in Missouri